"Legendary" is a song by American blues rock band Welshly Arms.  It was released in 2016,  and the music video was released on June 26, 2017.  The song was featured at the end of an episode of the NBC show, Shades of Blue, served as the end credits song for the 2018 film Den of Thieves, and was featured in the menu soundtrack of the video game Asphalt 9: Legends.

Charts

Weekly charts

Year-end charts

Certifications

References

2016 singles